East Coast Super Sound Punk of Today! is a compilation album by The World/Inferno Friendship Society. It features all but one of the songs from their first four singles plus one previously unreleased track. The missing song is "Nothing You Begin" from the "Tattoos Fade" single.

Track listing 

2000 compilation albums
The World/Inferno Friendship Society albums
Gern Blandsten Records albums